Paroligolophus is a genus of harvestman, formerly included in the genus Oligolophus. Two species recorded in the United Kingdom are:
 Paroligolophus agrestis
 Paroligolophus meadii

References

Harvestmen
Harvestman genera